The Campeonato de España de Fórmula Renault was a Formula Renault racing series based in Spain. It ran from 1991 to 1997. In 1998, the series ended and became the World Series by Nissan, later by Renault.

Champions

See also
Formula 3.5 V8
Formula Renault

References

Formula Renault 2.0 series
Formula Renault Championship